Viridrillia hendersoni is a species of sea snail, a marine gastropod mollusk in the family Pseudomelatomidae, the turrids and allies.

Description

Distribution
This marine species occurs off Florida and Texas, USA.

References

 P. Bartsch, 1943: A Review of Some West Atlantic Turritid Mollusks. Memorias de la Sociedad Cubana de Historia Natural, 17 (2)

External links
 Rosenberg G., Moretzsohn F. & García E. F. (2009). Gastropoda (Mollusca) of the Gulf of Mexico, Pp. 579–699 in Felder, D.L. and D.K. Camp (eds.), Gulf of Mexico–Origins, Waters, and Biota. Biodiversity. Texas A&M Press, College Station, Texas
 
 Gastropods.com: Viridrillia hendersoni

hendersoni
Gastropods described in 1943